The South American records in swimming are the fastest times ever swum by a swimmer representing a member federation of the South American Swimming Confederation (CONSANAT), South America's governing body of swimming.

Long course (50 m)

Men

Women

Mixed relay

Short course (25 m)

Men

Women

Mixed relay

References

External links
 Men's World, South American and Brazilian Records by CBDA
 Women's World, South American and Brazilian Records by CBDA
 South American Long Course Records
 South American Short Course Records

South America
Records
Swimming